Martin Joseph Manning (September 23, 1924 – April 14, 2015), known as Joe Manning, was an American politician who was a member of the Massachusetts House of Representatives. A member of the Democratic Party, represented the 7th Norfolk District from 1966 to 1996.

He was a lifelong resident of Milton, Massachusetts and served with the Marine Corps in World War II. He served for nearly seven decades on the Milton town meeting, serving from 1946 to his death in 2015.

He was survived by his wife of 50 years, Audrey, and his son, M. Joseph Manning Jr.

References

1924 births
2015 deaths
People from Milton, Massachusetts
Democratic Party members of the Massachusetts House of Representatives
United States Marine Corps personnel of World War II